The Czech Figure Skating Championships are figure skating national championships held annually to crown the national champions of the Czech Republic. Medals may be awarded in the disciplines of men's singles, ladies' singles, pair skating, and ice dancing on the senior, junior, and novice levels.

In the 2006–07 and 2007–08 seasons, the Czech and Slovak associations held their national championships together in one event. The Three National Championships were formed when Poland joined in the 2008–09 season. Following the addition of Hungary in the 2013–14 season, the event is known as the Four National Championships. Skaters from the four countries compete together and the results are split at the end of the competition to form national podiums.

Senior medalists

Men

Ladies

Pairs

Ice dancing

Junior medalists

Men

Ladies

Pairs

Ice dancing

References

External links
 Czech Skating 
 2005–06 Czech Figure Skating Championships results

 
Figure skating in the Czech Republic
Figure skating national championships
Figure skating